"Let a Boy Cry" is a song written and recorded by Italian singer-songwriter Gala. It was released in January 1997 as the second single from her debut album, Come into My Life (1997). The song achieved success in Europe, South America, Russia and Middle East and received a platinum record in France and Benelux. It peaked at number one in Belgium, France, Israel and Italy. On the Eurochart Hot 100, "Let a Boy Cry" reached number three. The song was written and composed by Gala, and produced by Filippo Andrea Carmeni and Maurizio Molella. According to Gala, it talks about how in a society where men would not be ridiculed for their sensitivity, women could be freer.

Critical reception
British magazine Music Week gave the song five out of five, adding, "Already a massive hit in Europe, Gala's second single is easily as catchy as the platinum "Freed From Desire". A broad range of mixes should guarantee strong radio airplay." Chris Finan from their RM Dance Update rated it four out of five, commenting that "[it's] needless to say [that] UK demand will be as vigorous on its impending release." Pop Rescue felt that the track "has a sense of dance about it. At times Gala’s vocals sound a bit flat and not unlike those of Divine. However, musically this song definitely lifts the tempo and sound up somewhat, and Gala’s vocals fit perfectly in the chorus."

Chart performance
"Let a Boy Cry" was a major hit in several countries and successful on the charts in Europe. It peaked at number-one in Belgium, France, Italy and Spain. The single also made it to a very respectable number three on the Eurochart Hot 100, and number 11 in the United Kingdom. In the latter, it reached that position in its first week on the UK Singles Chart on November 30, 1997. But on the UK Indie Chart, it was a even bigger hit, peaking at number-one. Additionally, it was a top 20 hit also in Ireland and Scotland, and a top 30 hit in Switzerland. "Let a Boy Cry" was awarded with a platinum record in France.

Music video
The accompanying music video for "Let a Boy Cry" was directed by director Philippe Antonello, Luca Bigazzi and Gala. It was shot in Venice in San Mark’s square during the Carnival. The video is in black-and-white. It was later published on YouTube in June 2013. As of August 2020, the video have amassed more than 8,8 million views. In a 2014 interview with DNA Magazine, Gala told about the video:

Track listings
 12" single
 "Let a Boy Cry" (full vocals mix) — 5:06
 "Let a Boy Cry" (edit mix) — 3:20
 "Let a Boy Cry" (the glittering mix) — 7:16

 CD single
 "Let a Boy Cry" (edit mix) — 3:20
 "Let a Boy Cry" (full vocals mix) — 5:06

 CD maxi
 "Let a Boy Cry" (edit mix) — 3:20
 "Let a Boy Cry" (full vocals mix) — 5:06
 "Let a Boy Cry" (the glittering mix) — 7:16

Charts and sales

Weekly charts

Year-end charts

Certifications

References

1996 songs
1997 singles
Gala (singer) songs
Ultratop 50 Singles (Flanders) number-one singles
Ultratop 50 Singles (Wallonia) number-one singles
SNEP Top Singles number-one singles
Number-one singles in Israel
Number-one singles in Italy
Number-one singles in Spain
UK Independent Singles Chart number-one singles
House music songs
Songs against racism and xenophobia
Black-and-white music videos
ZYX Music singles
PolyGram singles